Beaton is a Scottish surname which may have multiple origins. 

One origin of the name is from the placename Béthune, in Pas-de-Calais, France and is associated with the lowland clan Bethune. Another derivation of the surname is an Anglicisation of the Scottish Gaelic Mac Beath, and corresponds to the Beaton medical kindred of the Scottish Highlands and Western Isles. The surname Beaton can be represented in modern Scottish Gaelic as Peutan (masculine form), and Pheutan (feminine).

Another suggested derivation is from the mediaeval personal name Beaton or Beton, a pet form of a short form of the names Bartholomew or Beatrice. Bartholomew is a masculine name, while Beatrice is feminine; the names are not etymologically related to each other.

Notable people with the surname include:

 Alaina Beaton (born 1985), American singer-songwriter known professionally as Porcelain Black
 Alistair Beaton (born 1947), Scottish political satirist, novelist and television writer
 Cecil Beaton (1904–1980), English photographer
 Charlie Beaton (born 1995), Filipino footballer
 David Cardinal Beaton (1494–1545), last Scottish  Cardinal prior to the Reformation
 Ewan Beaton (born 1969), Canadian judoka
 James Beaton (1473–1539), Archbishop of Glasgow
 James Beaton II (1517–1603), Archbishop of Glasgow
 James Wallace Beaton (born 1943), Queen's Police Officer
 M. C. Beaton, pseudonym of Marion Chesney
 Kate Beaton, Canadian author of the webcomic "Hark! A Vagrant"
 Mary Beaton, attendant of Mary, Queen of Scots
 Noel Beaton (1925–2004), Australian politician
 Norman Beaton (1934–1994), Guyanese actor
 Rod Beaton (United Press International) (1923–2002), American journalist and media executive
 Rod Beaton (USA Today) (1951–2011), American sports journalist
 Roderick Beaton, academic at King's College London
 Rosie Beaton, Australian radio announcer
 Steve Beaton (born 1964), English darts player, 1996 BDO World Champion

References

English-language surnames
Scottish surnames
Surnames of Lowland Scottish origin